Daniel Bradaschia (born 2 March 1989) is an Italian footballer who plays as a forward for Mestre.

After the loan, Lumezzane bought Bradaschia in co-ownership deal for €150,000.

References

External links
FIGC 

1989 births
Living people
Italian footballers
Association football forwards
Serie B players
Slovenian PrvaLiga players
Treviso F.B.C. 1993 players
F.C. Lumezzane V.G.Z. A.S.D. players
Taranto F.C. 1927 players
Italian expatriate footballers
Expatriate footballers in Slovenia
Italian expatriate sportspeople in Slovenia
FC Koper players
Italy youth international footballers